The Punch Bowl is a pub in the city centre of York in England.

The business was founded in 1675 as a coffeehouse, and it became associated with the city's Whigs, who preferred to drink punch.  In 1761, it was licensed as a pub, and it became the headquarters of the York Races Committee, and was also popular with the bell ringers at York Minster.  In reference to this, a bell clapper from the Minster has been used as a support in the rear bar since 1765.

The building, on Stonegate, was largely rebuilt over the years, and then burned down in 1930.  It was rebuilt in a Brewers' Tudor style, designed by Biscomb and Ferry for the Tadcaster Tower Brewery, with red herringbone brick at the front of the ground floor, and plasterwork above.  The rear wing largely survives from the original building, as do three ground floor fireplaces.

The building was grade II listed in 1954.  In 2019, it was renovated, at which time, it was owned by Nicholson's.

References

External links

Grade II listed pubs in York
Buildings and structures completed in 1930
Stonegate (York)
Tudor Revival pubs